Key West is an unincorporated community in Dubuque County, Iowa, United States, near the extreme southern end of the city of Dubuque. Parts of the community are now within the city of Dubuque, while others are unincorporated. Owing to the presence of U.S. Highways 151, 61, and 52, and the nearby Dubuque Regional Airport, the area is home to a growing number of businesses. Some of these are high tech companies being built in the Dubuque Technology Park, to the east. Development in the area will likely increase rapidly following the planned construction of the city's Southwest Arterial.

The village does have a number of local establishments that allow it to maintain a certain degree of autonomy. It has its own church, St. Joseph's - Key West Catholic Church, a school (Table Mound Elementary), a cemetery (Mt. Olivet), Fire/EMS department, and a hotel (Econo Lodge Inn & Suites).

History
The town of Key West was settled in 1834, the year after Dubuque's founding. There was plenty of timber, prairie land and streams for water in section 12 of Table Mound Township, in Dubuque County, on the road that became the Old Military Road. Key West's population was 56 in 1902, and 52 in 1915.

The town was named because it was considered the main egress from Dubuque westward.

Education

St. Joseph School, under the Roman Catholic Archdiocese of Dubuque, was in Key West.

Notes
Information on Key West's beginnings is from the book My Old Dubuque by Len Kruse

External links 
 

Unincorporated communities in Dubuque County, Iowa
Unincorporated communities in Iowa
1834 establishments in Michigan Territory